Pedro Raul Garay da Silva (born 5 November 1996), known as Pedro Raul, is a Brazilian professional footballer who plays as a striker for Vasco da Gama.

Club career
Born in Porto Alegre, Rio Grande do Sul, Pedro Raul represented local side Cruzeiro-RS before joining Aimoré on loan for the 2016 Super Copa Gaúcha.

After returning to his parent club for the 2017 Campeonato Gaúcho, Pedro Raul only featured twice for Cruzeiro before moving to Vitória de Guimarães on 12 September 2017; he was initially assigned to the B-team in the LigaPro.

On 21 January 2019, Pedro Raul returned to his home country, after agreeing to a one-year loan deal with Série B side Atlético Goianiense. He was a regular starter during the year, winning the Campeonato Goiano and achieving promotion to the Série A.

On 17 January 2020, Pedro Raul was announced as the new signing of Botafogo in the top tier. He made his debut in the category on 19 August, starting in a 2–1 home win over Atlético Mineiro, and scored his first goal in the division on 30 September, but in a 2–1 away loss against Bahia.

As Pedro Raul's contract had an automatic extension if the player appeared in at least 60% of Botafogo's matches and his renewal would cost € 1.5 million (as the player had 70% of his economic rights and Botafogo was obliged to buy him), he was sold to Japanese club Kashiwa Reysol on 11 February 2021, for a fee of R$ 10 million. After having trouble adapting to the new country, and suffering a shoulder injury right after arriving, he only featured sparingly.

On 20 September 2021, Pedro Raul was announced at FC Juárez in the Liga MX. He left the club in December, and returned to Brazil on 31 January 2022, after agreeing to a loan deal with Goiás.

An undisputed starter at the Esmeraldino, Pedro Raul scored 19 league goals in the season (26 overall), being the division's second-best goalscorer (only behind Germán Cano). On 14 November 2022, he left the club.

On 11 December 2022, after standing out in the Brasileirão 2022, Vasco da Gama closed an agreement with Kashiwa Reysol, from Japan, and will pay US$ 2 million, about R$ 10.4 million, for the signing of the striker.

Career statistics

Honours

Individual
Campeonato Brasileiro Série A Team of the Year: 2022

References

External links

1996 births
Living people
Brazilian footballers
Association football forwards
Liga MX players
J1 League players
Campeonato Brasileiro Série A players
Campeonato Brasileiro Série B players
Liga Portugal 2 players
Esporte Clube Cruzeiro players
Clube Esportivo Aimoré players
Vitória S.C. B players
Atlético Clube Goianiense players
Botafogo de Futebol e Regatas players
Kashiwa Reysol players
FC Juárez footballers
Goiás Esporte Clube players
CR Vasco da Gama players
Brazilian expatriate footballers
Brazilian expatriate sportspeople in Portugal
Brazilian expatriate sportspeople in Japan
Brazilian expatriate sportspeople in Mexico
Expatriate footballers in Portugal
Expatriate footballers in Japan
Expatriate footballers in Mexico
Footballers from Porto Alegre